Yehuda Leib of Shpola (1725-1811) was a Hasidic Rebbe and was known as a popular miracle-worker and faith healer based in Shpola, Ukraine. He was also known as the Shpoler Zeide (Yiddish: "the Grandfather of Shpola"). He studied under the Baal Shem Tov and The Mezrticher Maagid. Aryeh Leib was associated with the third generation of Hasidism in the Ukraine; it has been suggested that he may be the same person as Reb Leib Sara's, however that is doubtful, as their fathers have different names.

His Birth 

After his parents, Baruch and Rochel, hosted the Baal Shem Tov (before he was known), he blessed them with a child that would be righteous and told him to name him Aryeh Leib. Soon they gave birth to him. At the bris the Baal Shem Tov said "I am an ignorant man, and I do not know how to say fancy blessings in Hebrew. But I remember how my father used to explain a verse in the Torah: 'And Abraham was old (zaken).' The Hebrew word for father is av, and the Hebrew word for grandfather is zaken. This verse tells us that Avraham was the grandfather of us all. I bless the child that he be a grandfather to the people of Israel, just like Avraham.” The crowd roared in good-natured laughter at the crude homily of the strange peasant, who so readily admitted his ignorance. But the nickname stuck. From then on, he was known as the zayde, Yiddish for “grandfather.”

His Passing 
6 Tishrei

References 

https://www.chabad.org/library/article_cdo/aid/3365399/jewish/The-Story-of-the-Baby-Who-Was-a-Grandfather.htm

1811 deaths
1725 births
Students of Dov Ber of Mezeritch
Ukrainian rabbis
Hasidic rebbes